'Nuff Said is a studio album by Ike & Tina Turner released on United Artist Records in 1971.

Background 

'Nuff Said was the third album released by Ike & Tina Turner in 1971; commercially their most successful year. The release of Workin' Together in December 1970 produced their hit single "Proud Mary" which helped propel the album to No. 3 on the Billboard Soul LP chart. In February 1971, Capitol Records reissued their album Get It – Get It and re-titled it Her Man. . . His Woman. Their live album What You Hear Is What You Get was released in July and peaked at No. 7 on the Billboard Soul LP chart. They were also included on the soundtrack Soul To Soul which was released in September and peaked at No. 10 on the Billboard Soul LPs chart.

Recording and release 
'Nuff Said was recorded at the Turner's own Bolic Sound studio in 1971. It features a two-part instrumental track as the title song. No singles were released from the album in the U.S., but it charted at No. 108 on the Billboard Top LPs and No. 21 on the Soul LPs charts. In 1972, "What You Don't See (Is Better Yet)" was released as a single in Brazil.

Critical reception 

Record World (November 6, 1971): "Like a book you can't put down, Ike and Tina's new album is one you can't turn off. Once heard, it has to be heard and heard again. No question this will bust blocks and immediately."

Billboard (November 13, 1971): This husband and wife team has always provided one of the most exciting concert acts possible and it's about time they had a real album winner. This entry will do it. "I Love What You Do To Me" has the feel of "Proud Mary" with Ike's bass voice pouring heavy. Other standouts include "Sweet Flustrations," "Moving Into Hip Style-A Trip Child" and "What You Don't See." Watch it Go!Cash Box (November 13, 1971):The fact that Ike & Tina can drop "Turner" from their act's name shows how popular they've gotten since touring with the Stones and starring in the "Soul To Soul" movie. The husband-and-wife team aim to please their expanded audience with a new look on the record jacket and a new sound inside. Listen to "Moving Into Hip Style-A Trip Child" and see what we mean, Ike plays organ instead of guitar this time out and his backup band has changed its name from the Kings of Rhythm to Family Vibs [sic] (shades of Sly!). "I Love What You Do To Me," "Can't You Hear Me Callin' "and the title tune are highlights.

Reissues 
'Nuff Said was digitally remastered and released by BGO Records on the compilation CD Come Together/'Nuff Said in 2010. In 2018, the album was reissued on CD by Universal Music.

Track listing

Personnel 

 Arranged by – Ike Turner
 Baritone saxophone – J.D. Reed
 Bass – Warren Dawson
 Drums – Soko Richardson
 Engineer – Ike Turner, Jim Saunders, Steve Waldman
 Guitar – Jackie Clark
 Organ – Ike Turner
 Producer – Ike Turner
 Tenor saxophone – Mary Reed
 Trombone – Edward Burks
 Trumpet – McKinley Johnson

Chart performance

References 

1971 albums
Ike & Tina Turner albums
Albums produced by Ike Turner
United Artists Records albums
Albums recorded at Bolic Sound